Uppal railway station is in  Hanumakonda district, Telangana. Its code is OPL. 

It serves Kamalapur and Nadikuda and Parkal mandals of Hanumakonda district and Mulugu and Bhupalpally districts. 

Uppal Railway station is situated on Kazipet–Peddapalli section. The station consists of two platforms. From Uppal railway station daily so many passengers travels to their destinations like Secundrabad, peddapally, macherial etc..It requires some development facilities like  displayers on platform for reservation boghi trains and modernisation of main platform and  waiting halls .

Major trains

 Kaghaznagar Superfast Express (Reserved)
 Sirpur Kaghaznagar–Secunderabad Intercity Express (Reserved)
 Bhagyanagar Express (Reserved)
 Ramgiri Passenger (unreserved)
 Singareni Passenger (unreserved)
 Peddapalli–Mahbubabad Passenger (unreserved)
 Ajni–Kazipet Passenger (unreserved)..etc

References

Railway stations in Hanamkonda district
Secunderabad railway division